The Men's 4 × 100 metre freestyle relay event at the 2010 Commonwealth Games took place on 4 October 2010, at the SPM Swimming Pool Complex.

Two heats were held, with both containing six countries. The heat in which a country competed in did not formally matter for advancement, as the countries with the top eight times from the entire field qualified for the finals.

Records
Prior to this competition, the existing world and Commonwealth Games records were as follows.

The following new world and Commonwealth Games records were set during this competition.

Results

Heats

Final

References

Aquatics at the 2010 Commonwealth Games